Bhodi Sooknoi (born 20 July 1938) is a Thai boxer. He competed in the men's lightweight event at the 1960 Summer Olympics. At the 1980 Summer Olympics in Rome, he lost to Richard McTaggart of Great Britain by decision in the Round of 32 after receiving a bye in the Round of 64.

References

External links
 

1938 births
Living people
Bhodi Sooknoi
Bhodi Sooknoi
Boxers at the 1960 Summer Olympics
Bhodi Sooknoi
Lightweight boxers